The Country Club of North Carolina, or CCNC, is a gated golf community in Pinehurst, North Carolina. The club is currently ranked as one of the Top 100 Country Clubs in America.

History 

The Country Club of North Carolina is the oldest gated golf community in the Sandhills, established in 1963. It was begun by several North Carolina investors, 4-6 individuals from each major North Carolina city. Together they purchased an initial 1,200 acres of rolling hills from 13 different land owners just south of the Village of Pinehurst and the notorious Pinehurst No. 2 golf course. Working with community planner William Byrd of Atlanta, Georgia, the group agreed on a master plan for the land they acquired, including a golf course, named Dogwood. The Cardinal Course would come later. Today, the club has a large membership base numbering close to 1,000 covering families across the state and around the world. Over 400 homes have been built over the years behind the gates.

Facilities 

The Country Club of North Carolina has a clubhouse, tennis club, and swimming pool that overlooks Watson Lake. A renovation plan has been developed for facilities and will be implemented over the following years.

Clubhouse 

The Country Club of North Carolina constructed its clubhouse in 1965, soon after the club's founding in 1963. Since then, numerous additions have added more space to the predominantly brick structure. The clubhouse overlooks one of the most scenic views in CCNC, being perched on a hill overlooking Watson Lake. The structure also has views of different holes of the Dogwood and Cardinal golf courses.

Tennis club 

The tennis complex is home to 8 Har-Tru tennis courts. Six of them are lighted for match play. The facility also hosts a new fitness center and pickleball courts.

Swimming pool 

The swimming pool was renovated in 2004.  The entire pool deck overlooks Watson Lake.

Golf courses 

The Country Club of North Carolina is home to two golf courses, called the Dogwood Course and the Cardinal Course. The Dogwood Course and the Cardinal Course went under renovation in 1999 and 2001, respectively. The practice facility went under renovation in 2006. Both courses are currently ranked in the top 20 courses in North Carolina.

Dogwood Course 

The Dogwood Course opened in 1963 surrounding Watson Lake and Lake Dornoch, the two biggest water features in the club. The course was designed by Ellis Maples and William Byrd. A full 18 holes was constructed. The course has hosted a number of different local, state and national tournaments. They include three Carolinas Amateurs, six Southern Amateurs, the PGA Tour World Match Play Championship, and the 1980 USGA Amateur. The club recently hosted the 2010 U.S. Girls Junior on the Dogwood Course. The 1999 renovation was overseen by Arthur Hills and included a rebuilding of the greens, tees, and bunkers.  In 2016, the course was switched over to Zeon Zoysia grass during the renovation by Kris Spence. The course is currently ranked 2nd in the Top Courses of the Sandhills Region and 3rd in the Top 100 Courses of North Carolina.

Cardinal Course 

The Cardinal Course began as a 9-hole golf course constructed in 1970. A second 9 holes was completed in 1981, bringing the hole count to 18. The course is currently ranked 7th in the Top Courses of the Sandhills Region and 16th in the Top 100 Courses of North Carolina.

East Lake at The Country Club of North Carolina 

In 2003, the Country Club of North Carolina established a long-range planning committee for an undeveloped 125-acre site overlooking Lake Dornoch. A member survey was sent out in 2004 to gauge opinions on developing the site. In 2005, a development team presented a conceptual master plan to the board of directors. The conceptual master plan was approved by the board and was given permission to move to the next stage of development. The property was rezoned and the master plan was unanimously approved by the Pinehurst Village Council. After all barriers had been cleared, the board of directors voted to develop the site. By 2006, the Country Club of North Carolina contracted The Fulton Group to oversee the design and construction of the site. Thomas & Denzinger Architects and Historical Concepts designed the initial seven homes. Ten home offerings are currently available. Since 2008, a total of six Lake Homes have been built.

References

External links 
The Country Club of North Carolina
NC Golf Panel 
USGA Info

Golf clubs and courses in North Carolina
Tourist attractions in Moore County, North Carolina
1963 establishments in North Carolina